The 1979 ICF Canoe Slalom World Championships were held in Jonquière, Quebec, Canada under the auspices of International Canoe Federation. It was the 16th edition. This marked the first time the championships were held outside Europe. The mixed C2 event was not held at these championships. East Germany did not take part and Czechoslovakia, as the other traditional powerhouse, won only one medal. West Germany won three medals while the United States led the medal count with seven, the first-time an English-speaking country had done so.

Medal summary

Men's

Canoe

Kayak

Women's

Kayak

Medals table

References
Official results
International Canoe Federation

Icf Canoe Slalom World Championships, 1979
ICF Canoe Slalom World Championships
International sports competitions hosted by Canada
Icf Canoe Slalom World Championships, 1979
1979 in Quebec
Canoeing and kayaking competitions in Canada